The Mayor of Coimbatore is the first citizen of the Indian city of Coimbatore. She/He is an elected politician who, along with 99 councillors of the Coimbatore Corporation is the chief administrator of the city.

The office of Mayor of Coimbatore, is currently held by A. Kalpana since 4 March 2022.

The Mayor is elected directly by the electorate. This was temporarily scrapped in 2006 in favour of an indirect election among the councillors. The process of direct elections was brought back in 2011 on the recommendation of the Election Commission of India.

The official residence of the Mayor is at Venkataswamy Road East in R.S. Puram.

List of Mayors 
The first mayor was elected in 1996. As of 2022, there have been six mayors, one from the Tamil Maanila Congress, three from the AIADMK , one from INC and one from the DMK.

External links 
 Mayor of Coimbatore

References 

People from Coimbatore
Coimbatore
 
Government of Coimbatore
Lists of people from Tamil Nadu
Coimbatore-related lists
Tamil Nadu politics-related lists